Upper Mulago Regional Referral Hospital, also known as Old Mulago Regional Referral Hospital, is a planned hospital in Uganda. When established, it is expected to serve as the regional referral hospital for the Kampala Metropolitan Area, which includes the capital city of Kampala (2014 population: 1,507,080) and the surrounding Wakiso District (2014 pop: 1,997,418).

Location
The coordinates of Upper Mulago are 0°20'27.0"N, 32°34'33.0"E (Latitude:0.340835; Longitude:32.575823).

Overview
Old Mulago Hospital was established in 1913. New Mulago Hospital or Lower Mulago Hospital as established in 1962. Together they form the "Mulago Hospital Complex" with 1,790 beds serving as the national referral hospital and the teaching hospital of the Makerere University College of Health Sciences. Lower Mulago is undergoing upgrades and renovation to make it a truly tertiary referral and teaching institution. What is planned is to upgrade Lower Mulago to a 900-bed facility, including a 400-bed  Mulago Women's and Neonatal Referral Hospital. Upper Mulago will then be transformed into a 600-bed, regional referral hospital for the Kampala metropolitan area, which lacks a hospital in that category.

Target population
The hospital is intended to serve as a regional referral hospital for the population in the Kampala Metropolitan Area, as part of the "Improvement of Health Services At Mulago National Referral Hospital And The City Of Kampala", funded by the African Development Bank.

See also
List of hospitals in Uganda
Naguru General Hospital
Kawempe General Hospital
Kiruddu General Hospital

References

External links
Mulago National Referral Hospital
Website of Uganda Ministry of Health
Mulago To Be Split Into Five Hospitals As of 8 May 2018.

Hospitals in Kampala
Hospitals established in 1913
1913 establishments in Uganda